Woodlawn station (also known as Woodlawn–East 233rd Street station) is a commuter rail stop on the Metro-North Railroad's Harlem Line, serving the Woodlawn section of the Bronx, New York City. It is located on East 233rd Street near Webster Avenue. Just north of the station is Woodlawn Junction, where the New Haven Line splits from the Harlem Line to join the Northeast Corridor.

History

The New York and Harlem Railroad laid tracks through Woodlawn during the mid-1840s as part of their effort to expand the line to Tuckahoe. A March 17, 1848 agreement gave the New York and New Haven Railroad trackage rights over the NY&H from Williamsbridge south into New York City. Service was shared by the NY&H as well as the NY&NH, which was merged with the Hartford and New Haven Railroad to form the New York, New Haven and Hartford Railroad in 1872, and the trackage rights along the Harlem Division remained intact. Throughout the late-19th Century, the Harlem Division was widened and rebuilt into an open cut line as part of a grade elimination project, and Woodlawn Station was one of several in the Bronx that were rebuilt with a station house on a bridge over all four tracks, including Fordham, Melrose, the former Morrisania and Tremont stations. The expansion of the line in the Bronx, prompted the New York Central and New Haven Railroads to convert the Woodlawn Junction into a flyover bridge between 1910 and 1915. Modifications were made to the junction in later years, most recently by Metro-North in 1986.

Due to the popularity of football games between the Fordham Rams and Yale Bulldogs in the 1920s, joint service between the New York Central Railroad and New York, New Haven and Hartford was moved from Woodlawn to Fordham Station. Nevertheless, the station remained active. The realignment of the Bronx River Parkway between 1953 and 1955 converted the southbound lanes into off and on ramps to East 233rd Street via Webster Avenue. The northbound lanes were partially converted into a small parking lot for the station.

As with other NYC stations in the Bronx, the station became a Penn Central station once the NYC & Pennsylvania Railroads merged in 1968. Penn Central acquired the New Haven Railroad in 1969, but the New Haven continued to stop only at Fordham station. However, because of the railroad's serious financial distress following the merger, commuter service was turned over to the Metropolitan Transportation Authority in 1972. The station house which was built over the tracks survived well into the 1970s. The station became part of Metro-North Railroad in 1983.

In April 2014, Metro North installed a series of solar-powered electronic kiosks at the station that allowed commuters to access train and bus schedules without using internet access.

Station layout
The station has two high-level side platforms, each four cars long. When trains stop at the station, normally the front four open cars receive and discharge passengers. Both platforms are accessible by stairway from East 233rd Street, and the western platform also accesses the station's parking lot on Webster Avenue, as well as the southbound Bronx River Parkway service road.

References

External links

Woodlawn Metro-North Station images (WorldNYCSubway.org) 
Woodlawn Metro-North Station (The Subway Nut)
 233rd Street entrance from Google Maps Street View
Platforms from Google Maps Street View

Metro-North Railroad stations in New York City
Former New York Central Railroad stations
Railway stations in the Bronx